Vladimir Horowitz – The Complete Original Jacket Collection is a 70 CD boxed set featuring most of the recordings of the pianist Vladimir Horowitz. The collection contains recordings from 1928 to his final recording session just four days before his death in 1989. Horowitz's recordings for RCA Red Seal and Columbia Masterworks/Sony Classical are included in the set.  Recordings that Horowitz made for RCA's European affiliate, HMV, are not included.  Nor are the recordings he made with Deutsche Grammophon from 1985 to 1989.  It is one of the largest issues in the Original Jacket Collection series, and supersedes two smaller Original Jacket issues of Horowitz material.

Overview
The box includes 70 CDs, all of which are stored in individual sleeves.  Also included is a 200-page booklet which includes track listings, recording dates, an essay by producer Jon Samuels, and a chronology of Horowitz's life.  The  original LP album format is used along with the original album front and back covers and content sequencing.  Liner notes are included only in cases where they appeared on the back covers of the original LPs.  

Horowitz's first audio recordings were made on 78rpm disks.  After the LP came into use in the late 1940s, all of Horowitz's recordings were issued in this format.  In addition, until the early 1950s, some of Horowitz's recordings were issued on 78rpm, 45rpm, and LP.  Many, but not all, of the pianist's older recordings were transferred to LP.    

Those 78rpm recordings which were never issued on LP are contained on a separate disc with newly created cover art.  Several of the recordings which post-date the demise of the LP use the original CD covers instead of LP covers.  The set also contains two previously unissued recitals: March 5, 1951 at Carnegie Hall; and November 12, 1967 at Whitman Auditorium, Brooklyn College.  

The recordings from 1959 onward are in stereophonic sound, and from 1981 onward the recordings were made digitally.  Previously issued material uses the best existing transfers, while the new material is newly remastered.

On October 1, 2010 - the 107th anniversary of Horowitz's birth - The Complete Original Jacket Collection won Gramophone's award for best CD reissue.

Contents

References

Vladimir Horowitz
2009 compilation albums